This was the first edition of the event.

Leonardo Lavalle and Mike Leach won the title, defeating Scott Davis and David Pate 7–6, 6–4 in the final.

Seeds

  Paul Annacone /  Christo van Rensburg (semifinals)
  Peter Fleming /  John McEnroe (semifinals)
  Scott Davis /  David Pate (final)
  Sherwood Stewart /  Kim Warwick (quarterfinals)

Draw

Draw

External links
 Main draw

Tennis Channel Open
1986 Grand Prix (tennis)